Olaf Fricke (born 1 January 1951 in Zeitz) is a former West German slalom canoeist who competed in the 1970s.

He won a gold medal in the C-2 team event at the 1973 ICF Canoe Slalom World Championships in Muotathal.

Fricke also finished seventh in the C-2 event at the 1972 Summer Olympics in Munich.

External links

1951 births
Canoeists at the 1972 Summer Olympics
German male canoeists
Living people
Olympic canoeists of West Germany
Medalists at the ICF Canoe Slalom World Championships
People from Zeitz
Sportspeople from Saxony-Anhalt